JCI or Johannesburg Consolidated Investment Co. Ltd. was founded in 1889 by the British entrepreneur Barney Barnato. JCI was a major force in South African mining for over 100 years. Using his investments in the Kimberley diamond fields, particularly his 25% share in De Beers, Barnato foresaw the value of and invested in the potential of the Witwatersrand gold mines. At first he bought small but rich mines near Germiston – the New Primrose, named after his daughter, and others in the same region.

In 1913 JCI bought the Randfontein Estates Gold Mining Company, which was a fabulously rich mine, from Sir J.B. Robinson. At the peak of its production Randfontein was equipped with 600 stamp mills, the roar of which could be heard in Johannesburg. Randfontein Estates was an extraordinarily rich mining property, and in the 1950s was a pioneer of uranium production. During the 1930s Randfontein was the largest gold producer in South Africa, if not the world.

JCI was also involved with numerous mining ventures – New State Mines at Brakpan, Modder Deep Mines at Benoni, Van Dyk Mines at Benoni. In the 1960s Randfontein was virtually closed down, and mining was developed at Western Areas on the other side of the shallow valley, but in the 1970s new deposits were discovered to the south of Randfontein and the Cooke Section was opened up in 1976. Cooke produced gold and uranium, the uranium being destined for the Koeberg Nuclear Power Station fuel.

In addition to the gold mines, 25% of De Beers and a controlling interest in Rustenburg Platinum Holdings, the world's largest platinum producer, JCI owned large industrial and property holdings, including the Houghton Estate in northern Johannesburg, and substantial shareholdings in South African Breweries, Toyota South Africa, Lennings Industrial, etc., and was long a target of developers who lusted after the property holdings. Anglo American Corporation purchased a 52% holding in JCI, agreeing to protect the company against predatory takeovers, and this situation continued until 1994.

JCI installed a technically advanced Precious Metals Refinery at Rustenburg, which processed Platinum Group metals totally in South Africa, and built a ferrochrome smelter at Lydenburg which was the first in South Africa to directly smelt chromite fine ore.

In the late 1980s JCI started development of an ultra deep mine to the south of Western Areas, South Deep. The ownership of South Deep has now devolved to Gold Fields, and the deposit is still being developed as one of the largest low-grade gold deposits in the world.

In 1995 the majority shareholder, Anglo American Corp, decided to offer JCI to the new political dispensation in South Africa as a Black Economic Empowerment vehicle. A new Chairman, Mzi Khumalo, took over the mining side, whilst the property and investment side was separated and morphed into Johnnic Communications. The platinum interests were moved into Anglo American Platinum, Amplats.
JCI was always at the forefront of technical development – trackless mining, ferrochrome processing (CMI, Lydenburg), computer control of process plants, treatment of refractory gold ores – to name a few areas where pioneering work was done.

Alleged crimes
It has been alleged by Four Corners that Brett Kebble, John Stratton, and others in their roles as Chairman and directors of the company respectively defrauded and conspired to defraud the company of some 7.6 billion rand.  Additionally, it was alleged that John Stratton then procured Brett Kebble's murder, with which Glenn Agliotti has been charged.

In August 2010, an American company Hemispherx was awarded $188 million Judgment Against JCI by Court in Miami, alleging that JCI wrongly obtained confidential information as part of an effort to devalue Hemispherx's stock price and gain control, according to court papers.

See also 
 MacDuff v JCI.

References

External links 
 company page
 Four Corner's "Bad Company" transcript
 Four Corner's "Bad Company" references
  Bloomberg article on court case against JCI

Mining companies of South Africa
Coal companies of South Africa
Uranium mining companies of South Africa
Gold mining companies of South Africa
Platinum mining companies
Non-renewable resource companies established in 1889
1889 establishments in the Cape Colony